Alakurapadu is a village in Prakasam District of the Indian state of Andhra Pradesh. It is located in Tangutur Mandal of Ongole revenue division.

References

Villages in Prakasam district